Tintinhull Court in Tintinhull, Somerset, England, was built as a medieval parsonage for the Church of St Margaret. It has been designated as a Grade I listed building.

The Hamstone building was re-modelled in 1678, 1777 and 1927, with the first of these being by the prior of nearby Montacute Priory. After the dissolution of the monasteries it became crown property belonging to Henry VIII who sold it to Sir William Petre who sold it in 1546 to the Napper family who owned it for the next 250 years from their purchase of it in 1546. During the 17th century they built Tintinhull House as a Dower House.

In 2009 the house was put up for sale with an asking price of around £2million.

See also
 List of Grade I listed buildings in South Somerset

References

Medieval architecture
Grade I listed buildings in South Somerset
Clergy houses in England
Grade I listed houses in Somerset
Hamstone buildings